Andy De Emmony (born ; sometimes spelled DeEmmony) is a British television and film director.

Career 
De Emmony has worked primarily in comedy, including Red Dwarf VI, Father Ted, Spitting Image. He has directed two features: the comedy sequel West is West and the comedy horror Love Bite.

He has won one BAFTA (British Academy Television Award for Best Comedy (Programme or Series), Father Ted, 1999) and has picked up nominations for his work on Spitting Image, Cutting It, The Canterbury Tales and Kenneth Williams: Fantabulosa!.

References

External links 

1960s births
Living people
BAFTA winners (people)
English television directors
English television producers